Gastrodigenin is a phenolic compound found in the rhizome of Gastrodia elata.

Gastrodin is the glucoside of gastrodigenin.

See also 
 Habenariol, a phenolic compound found in the semi aquatic orchid Habenaria repens

References 

Natural phenols
diols
Gastrodia
Perfume ingredients